This is a list of natural lakes and reservoirs located fully or partially in the U.S. state of Washington. Natural lakes that have been altered with a dam, such as Lake Chelan, are included as lakes, not reservoirs.

Natural lakes
Currently included in this table are all natural and enhanced lakes with a surface area of more than 1,000 acres or a volume of more than 25,000 acre feet as well as smaller lakes (down to 100 acres) with a Wikipedia page.

Reservoirs

See also

List of dams in the Columbia River watershed
List of dams and reservoirs in the United States#Washington

Notes

References

External links

Water Supply Bulletins - index to bulletins focused on lakes.

Washington
Lakes